2nd Anniversary is the fifteenth studio album recorded by American R&B group Gladys Knight & the Pips, released in October 1975 on the Buddah label.  It was their fourth overall album for Buddah.

The first single release, "Money", was moderately successful, reaching #4 R&B and #50 on the Billboard Hot 100.  The second single, "Part Time Love", was more successful, peaking at #22 pop and #4 R&B.  It would be their last single to reach the top 40 on the Billboard Hot 100 until 1988.  The song also charted on the adult contemporary and UK Singles charts, #17 and #30, respectively.

Track listing

Charts
Album

Singles

References

External links
2nd Anniversary at Discogs

Gladys Knight & the Pips albums
1975 albums
Buddah Records albums